Knipex (mirroring German ) is a German manufacturer of pliers, pliers wrenches, and other tools, distributed for global sales. Its tools are principally for professional use in various trades, but they are also increasingly popular for DIY and EDC use as well.

For four generations, Knipex has been an independent, owner-managed family company. Its headquarters are located in Wuppertal-Cronenberg.

History
The company was founded in 1882 by C. Gustav Putsch as a forge. In the early days manufacturing was focused on pincers and blacksmith’s tongs, initially handmade then increasingly produced using drop forging hammers and various machines. In 1942 Carl Putsch, the second generation representative, registered the “Knipex“ brand. Especially since the 1950s the program has constantly had additional types of pliers added to it. Karl Putsch took over as manager in 1954. Manufacturing operations became increasingly automated and product innovation took ever greater importance. Starting in the 1990s various subsidiaries joined the Knipex Group. The fourth generation took over the company’s reins. Foreign sales offices were established, and nowadays more than 60 percent of output is exported to numerous countries worldwide.

Product line
The program currently comprises approximately 100 types of pliers, totalling more than 900 different variants in terms of length, shape and finish. These include commonly used types of pliers such as combination pliers, side cutters and water pump pliers as well as more specialized pliers for use in electrical and plumbing installation and electronics. The range also includes special tools for cutting, stripping and crimping including tools for applications in aerospace, solar power technology and optical fiber installation. Knipex also offers a broad program of high-voltage insulated tools. Knipex has built up a reputation of being a strong innovator in its field with products like self-locking water pump pliers ("Alligator" pliers), precision push-button water pump pliers ("Cobra" pliers), high-leverage mini bolt cutters ("Cobolt" cutters) and parallel jaw, ratchet action wrenches ("Pliers Wrench").

Employment and training
More than 1,000 staff are employed at the Wuppertal site, including more than 40 trainees in different apprenticeships. There is a dedicated training workshop for industrial trainees. All trainees are offered additional works classes.

Manufacturing
 
In addition to specializing in pliers, the company strategy includes complete in-house manufacturing. The intention here is to directly influence all the products' quality based characteristics, like precision, hardness and ease of operation. In addition to drop forging with its own tool manufacturing the production offering also includes machining (broaching, drilling, milling and grinding) as well as laser machining. The joining of the two pliers shanks - typically by riveting – is followed by repeated heat treatment (heating and tempering) as well as various surface treatments (chrome-plating, painting, polishing).

KNIPEX Tools LP
KNIPEX Tools LP is the North American Sales, Manufacturing and Marketing branch of KNIPEX. Located in Arlington Heights, Illinois the company supports their markets in the United States and Canada with a professional sales, marketing, customer service and administrative staff.

Knipex Group
Knipex is the original parent company of the Knipex group, with a total of over 1,600 employees in four German production companies (KNIPEX-Werk in Wuppertal, RENNSTEIG Werkzeuge in Viernau, OrbisWill in Ahaus and Will in Neustadt) as well as a number of sales companies abroad, including the USA, Russia, China, the Middle East and Mexico.

Knipex museum
The company is home of a two-story museum exhibiting machinery, tools, workplaces and everyday objects showing what working and living conditions were like in the region's tool industry in the past. The museum is open to the general public once a year as part of the Wuppertal-24h-live event.

References

Sources
 The Popular Mechanics Magazine featuring the Knipex Pliers Wrench
 Klaus Koch: Weltklasse – Marktführer aus Wuppertal. Girardet Verlag, Düsseldorf 2003, .
 Jürgen Eschmann: Wirtschaftsstandort Cronenberg. Die Unternehmen, die Menschen, die Produkte. Wuppertal 2007, S. 74 ff.
 Ohne Knipex bleibt der Airbus unten - Press article in the Westdeutschen Zeitung - Newspaper
 Innovative Zangen packen besser zu - Press article in the Westdeutschen Zeitung - Newspaper

External links

 

Tool manufacturing companies of Germany
Companies based in North Rhine-Westphalia
Museums in North Rhine-Westphalia
History museums in Germany
Technology museums in Germany
German brands